Marc C. McGovern is a Cambridge (Massachusetts) City Council member and was the 78th mayor from 2018 until 2020.

Biography
McGovern grew up in Central Square, Cambridge and graduated from Cambridge Rindge and Latin School.  In 2003, he began his political career on the Cambridge School Committee. After serving four terms on the Committee, he was elected to the Cambridge City Council in 2013. He was named mayor by the Cambridge City Council and sworn in on January 1, 2018, succeeding E. Denise Simmons. In January 2020, he announced that he would not seek re-election and endorsed fellow councilmember Sumbul Siddiqui as his successor. Siddiqui was sworn in on January 6, 2020.

References

Mayors of Cambridge, Massachusetts
Living people
Cambridge Rindge and Latin School alumni
Politicians from Cambridge, Massachusetts
Cambridge, Massachusetts City Council members
Year of birth missing (living people)